The Book of Mercy is the debut novel of the American writer Kathleen Cambor.

Narrated in alternate chapters by Edmund Mueller, an 83-year-old retired Pittsburgh, Pennsylvania firefighter, and his daughter, Anne, a 42-year-old psychiatrist and single mother, the novel weaves a family saga of two Catholic German-Americans.

References

1996 American novels
Novels set in Pittsburgh
PEN/Faulkner Award for Fiction-winning works
1996 debut novels
Farrar, Straus and Giroux books